Frederick Monroe de Selding (22 June 1887 – 25 November 1971, in Hackettstown, New Jersey) was an American athlete.  He competed at the 1908 Summer Olympics in London.

In the 400 metres, de Selding placed second in his preliminary heat to Wyndham Halswelle, the eventual gold medalist.  De Selding's time was 50.8 seconds.  He did not advance to the semifinals.

He graduated from Harvard University.

References

Sources
 
 
 

1887 births
1971 deaths
Athletes (track and field) at the 1908 Summer Olympics
Olympic track and field athletes of the United States
American male sprinters
Harvard Crimson men's track and field athletes